Didier Bourrier (18 May 1955 – 26 October 1987) was a French racing cyclist. He rode in the 1979 Tour de France.

References

1955 births
1987 deaths
French male cyclists
Place of birth missing